Upper Pengelli is a farm in the township of Pengelli  in Kerry in the historic county of Montgomeryshire, which is now part of Powys. The farmhouse is a timber-framed house of Lobby entry type probably dating from the earlier part of the 17th century.  A gabled wing was added at a right angles to the main house in  the mid-19th century, when it was partly brick faced. The  tile hanging on the house which imitates slate is mid-20th century.  The farm buildings are an example of a small model or Industrial farm by the architects Poundley and Walker. It was part of the Brynllywarch Estates owned by the Naylor Family. It was sold in 1931 to Montgomeryshire County Council and after 1974 became  a Powys County Council Smallholding.  In the 1980s it was  designated for conversion into a Rural Life Museum. It subsequently became derelict and in 2014 offered for sale by Powys County Council.

The Model Farm or Homestead

The design of the farm buildings are based on the design in Poundley's Cottage Architecture which was published in 1857. Poundley was the architect for the Naylor Estates and worked from Black Hall in Kerry.  The intention was to build a smaller version of the Victorian Model or Industraial Farms of the mid- 19th century. Poundley would have been working on the much larger farm complex which he had designed for John Naylor at Leighton Hall near Welshpool. Poundley published layout has been modified and scaled down  at Upper Pengelli. The long spinal building with a central ventilator, that was for cattle stalls was shortened and pigsties and sheepfolds were parallel with, rather than at right angles to the spinal building. As in the plan the hay barn with its ventilated brick windows and the stabling is at right angles. There was also a root store for feeding the cattle and a raised seed store. The sheep fold later was adapted to be used as cart sheds.  The farm would have been highly mechanised with a drive shaft, possibly powered by a steam engine, that  runs down the spinal building.

The Farmhouse

This stands to the north of the model farm and has striking views over the valley of the upper Mule stream. It appears to be fairly recent in date, but the core of the house is timber framed. Upstairs there is an ‘‘Ornate’’ door opening cut into a wall-plate which is very similar to an example at  Cilthriew, Kerry. and is likely to date the building to the early 17th century.  A further bay was added to the building and a wing at right angles in the 19th century, when the building was faced in brick. The imitation slate cladding is fairly recent.  In more recent times the  house was split into two cottages.

Literature

 Wade-Martin S Historic Farm Buildings  Batsford, London 1991.

References

Upper Pengelli Gallery

Houses in Powys
Timber-framed houses in Wales
Farms in Wales
Buildings and structures in Powys
Farmhouses in Wales